The 2016–17 Ural season was the club's 4th successive season that the club played in the Russian Premier League, the highest tier of association football in Russia.

Squad

 (captain)

Youth team
As per Russian Football Premier League.

Transfers

Summer

In:

Out:

Winter

In:

Out:

Competitions

Russian Premier League

Results by round

Matches

League table

Russian Cup

Final

Squad statistics

Appearances and goals

|-
|colspan="14"|Players away from the club on loan:
|-
|colspan="14"|Players who appeared for Ural Yekaterinburg no longer at the club:

|}

Goal Scorers

Disciplinary Record

References

FC Ural Yekaterinburg seasons
Ural